The Leicester Haymarket Theatre is a theatre in Leicester, England, next to the Haymarket Shopping Centre on Belgrave Gate in Leicester City centre.

History
The Haymarket Theatre was opened by Sir Ralph Richardson and the opening season started with The Recruiting Officer on 17 October 1973, Economic Necessity on 24 October and Cabaret on 21 November. Leicester City Council purchased a 99-year lease of the theatre in 1974.

Between 1974 and 2007 the theatre was operated by The Leicester Theatre Trust. The trust vacated the theatre in 2007 when it moved to the newly built Curve Theatre, Leicester in Leicester's Cultural Quarter. The last show held at the Haymarket by the Leicester Theatre Trust was Wizard of Oz starring Helena Blackman and Ceri Dupree in 2006. The theatre was closed in 2007 and remained so for the next 10 years.

In June 2016 the management of the theatre was taken over by an organisation known as the Haymarket Consortium who undertook that it would be re-opened as a performance, training and e-sports venue. The theatre was re-opened for performances on 2 March 2017 and a formal opening ceremony took place later that year. The theatre closed again in March 2020, during the Coronavirus pandemic and entered liquidation on 22 May 2020.

Metal Tree sculpture
The Metal Tree sculpture by Hubert Dalwood, at the front of the entrance to the Haymarket Theatre, was the only major piece of abstract sculpture in the city centre for many years. It was unveiled in 1974.

Notable productions
 Joseph and the Amazing Technicolor Dreamcoat in 1974 directed by Robin Midgley and featuring Maynard Williams as Joseph
 Oliver! in 1977 directed by Robin Midgley and featuring Roy Hudd
 The Ghost of Daniel Lambert in 1981 written by Sue Townsend and starred Leicester actor Perry Cree
 Me and My Girl in 1984 directed by Mike Ockrent and featuring Robert Lindsay, Emma Thompson, and Frank Thornton
 Macbeth in 1984 directed by Nancy Meckler and featuring Bernard Hill and Julie Walters
 M Butterfly in 1989 directed by John Dexter and featuring Sir Anthony Hopkins
 Murders in the Rue Morgue in 1989 directed by Simon Usher

Image gallery

See also
 Curve (theatre)
 Little Theatre (Leicester)
 Sue Townsend Theatre
 De Montfort Hall

References

Leicester
Theatres in Leicester
Culture in Leicestershire